Barbara Soky (born Bara Sokoroma) is a Nigerian actress and former singer who rose to fame in the TV soap Mirror in the Sun. Following a hiatus after various roles in the 1980s and 1990s, Soky revived her acting career, appearing in Nollywood movies and other soaps.

Acting
Soky's first major acting role was as office receptionist Rosemary Hart in the NTA series Inside Out. Originally an NTA Port Harcourt production, the sitcom gained popularity across Eastern Nigeria following syndication within other NTA stations via exchange. Soky also had a part alongside Adiela Onyedibia in You Can't Take Your Wife to New York, a series about a Nigerian ambassador with an illiterate wife.

After Inside Out ended, Rivers-native Soky moved to Lagos where she starred in  Lola Fani-Kayode's serial Mirror in the Sun. Her role as Yinka Fawole, a seductive young woman in love with two polar opposites, shot her to national stardom and led to a commercial for Jik bleach. After Mirror in the Sun, Soky was among the original cast of Ripples as unlucky-in-love city lawyer Daphne Wellington-Cole, from 1988 to 1993.

After a 13-year hiatus that briefly saw her venture into television presenting, Soky returned to acting with the Amaka Igwe production Solitaire as Nkoyo Broderick, a woman determined to protect the family's wealth. Most recently, she has appeared in the series Journey of the Beats.

Music
In 1986, Soky released the album Going Places under Mercury Records. Prior to earning a record deal, her character Rosemary in Inside Out had sung on the show.

Awards
In 2013 Soky was named Best Actress in a Supporting Role at the 2013 Nollywood Movies Awards for her performance in the film Bridge of Hope. In 2014 she received the same nomination for her role in the film Brothers Keeper at the Africa Movie Academy Awards.

Personal life
Soky has a daughter, Maxine.

Filmography

References

External links
 

20th-century Nigerian actresses
21st-century Nigerian actresses
Year of birth missing (living people)
Living people
Nigerian film actresses
Nigerian television actresses
Nigerian women singers
Nigerian television personalities
Actresses from Rivers State
People from Rivers State
Nigerian television presenters
Nigerian musicians